Rovná is a municipality and village in Sokolov District in the Karlovy Vary Region of the Czech Republic. It has about 300 inhabitants.

Administrative parts
The village of Podstrání is an administrative part of Rovná.

References

Villages in Sokolov District